Coccopygia, is a genus of small seed-eating birds in the family Estrildidae. They are distributed across central and southern Africa.

Taxonomy
The genus Coccopygia was introduced in 1862 by the German naturalist Ludwig Reichenbach. The name combines the Ancient Greek kokkos meaning "scarlet" with -pugios meaning "-rumped". The type species was designated as the swee waxbill by Richard Bowdler Sharpe in 1890. The genus Coccopygia is sister to the olivebacks in the genus Nesocharis.

Species
The genus contains three species:

References

 
Bird genera
Estrildidae
Waxbills
 
Taxa named by Ludwig Reichenbach